Milium effusum, the American milletgrass or wood millet, is a species of flowering plant in the grass family Poaceae, native to damp forests of the Holarctic Kingdom.

The Latin specific epithet effusum means "spreading loosely".

Habitat
Milium effusum inhabits damp, deciduous woods and shaded banks, where it grows on winter-wet, calcareous to mildly acidic clay and loam soils, and also over rocks in western Scotland.

Distribution
It can be found in the northern United States and Canada, and Europe, including Britain but excluding the Mediterranean, east to Siberia and the Himalayas.

Cultivation
The yellow-leaved cultivar 'Aureum', known as Bowles' golden grass, is cultivated as an ornamental garden plant, and in the UK has won the Royal Horticultural Society’s Award of Garden Merit.

Gallery

References

Further reading
 P. de Frenne et al. Biological Flora of the British Isles: Milium effusum, Journal of Ecology, 2017, DOI: 10.1111/1365-2745.12744. Detailed overview of all aspects relevant to ecology and behaviour.

Pooideae
Grasses of the United States
Grasses of Canada
Plants described in 1753
Taxa named by Carl Linnaeus